The IIFA Best Story  is chosen by the viewers and the winner is announced at the ceremony.

List of Winners
The winners are listed below:

See also 
 IIFA Awards
 Bollywood
 Cinema of India

References

External links
 2007 winners

International Indian Film Academy Awards